Somerset West is a town in the Western Cape, South Africa. Organisationally and administratively it is included in the City of Cape Town metropolitan municipality as a suburb of the Helderberg region (formerly called Hottentots Holland).
The vehicle registration code for Somerset West is CFM and the post code is 7130 for street addresses, and 7129 for post office boxes.

History 

A cattle post was established here by Dutch soldiers in 1672.
 
Willem Adriaan was later sent back to Holland after being charged with corruption and cruelty towards local Dutch farmers. The farm is now owned by a subsidiary of the large mining company Anglo American, who have restored the farmhouse to its original magnificence and continue to produce some of South Africa's best wines there. The farm is open to tourists.

Somerset West was founded in 1822 on part of the historic farm, Vergelegen. The town was named Somerset after a British governor of the Cape Colony during the 1800s, Lord Charles Somerset, with the suffix 'West' being added after 1825 to differentiate it from Somerset East, another South African town in the Eastern Cape. In the 1830s, Sir Lowry's Pass, named after later governor Sir Lowry Cole, was constructed to link the town with outposts further east over the Hottentots-Holland mountains.

In the 1960s, the AECI factory between Somerset West and Strand was the second largest dynamite factory in the world.

Geography
The town borders Strand and Gordon's Bay and is overlooked by the Helderberg Mountain (meaning "clear mountain"), a part of the Hottentots-Holland range of mountains. The Hottentots-Holland mountains surround Somerset West in an amphitheatre shape.

Suburbs
Somerset West includes more than 65 suburbs covering a large area of 61.37 square kilometres within its administrative boundaries, extending from the satellite villages of Firgrove in the west and Sir Lowry's Pass Village in the east. It includes the following suburbs:
Andas Estate
Bel' Aire
Bene
Bergaio
Boskloof Eco Estate
Braeview
Bridgebank
Bridgewater
Briza
Canwick
Carey Parks
Cherrywood Gardens
Chris Nissen Village
Dennegeur
Die Wingerd
Dorhill
Erinvale Golf Estate
Fairview Heights 
Firgrove (incl. Firgrove Rural)
Fraai Gelegen
Garden Village
Golden Acre
Golden Hill
Greenway Rise
Haumannshof
Helderberg
Helderberg Estate 
Helderberg Rural
Helderberg Village 
Helderrand
Heldervue 
Helderzicht
Helena Heights 
Heritage Mews
Heritage Park
Illaire
Jacques Hill
Jonkershoogte
Kalamunda
La Concorde
La Montagne 
La Sandra
Land en Zeezicht
Lionviham
Longdown Estate
Lynn's View
Martinville
Montclair
Monte Sereno
Morningside 
Natures Valley
Olive Grove
Paardevlei 
Parel Vallei
Pearl Marina
Radloff Park
Rome Glen
Shady Glen 
Sir Lowry's Pass Village
Somerset Ridge
Spanish Farm (incl. Spanish Farm Ext 1)
Steenbras View
Steyn's Nest
Stuart's Hill
The Vines
Victoria Park
Westridge
Zandberg

Greater Somerset West which extends beyond the town's administrative boundaries also includes the nearby settlements of Croydon and Macassar to the west. 

Greater Somerset West has also grown tremendously in the past decade with developments both taking place in the east and west of Somerset West but most notably in the west of the town. 

The development west of Somerset West is currently stringing along the N2 and R102 on the large open space between Croydon and Firgrove which separates the Helderberg region from the Cape Flats region along the False Bay. The large open space which once isolated Somerset West from the rest of the Cape Metropole has slowly been closed by the development merging the rest of the metropole with Helderberg to form a more integrated metropolitan area. The developments here mainly consist of gated estates such as the Sitari Country Estate, Croydon Vineyard Estate, Croydon Olive Estate and Kelderhof Country Village. 

In the south-west of Somerset West is the current mixed-use development of Paardevlei which includes a new private hospital owned by Busamed.

Retail
Being the largest town in the Helderberg region, Somerset West also serves as the main retail hub for the region as well as further surrounding towns such as Grabouw, Botrivier and Stellenbosch.

The largest shopping centre in Somerset West is Somerset Mall located on the corner of the R44 Broadway Boulevard and N2 at the Exit 43 off-ramp. There is a large concentration of retail facilities in the vicinity of Somerset Mall, such as Helderberg Mall, Somerset Value Centre and The Sanctuary. 

Waterstone Village Shopping Centre is located on the corner of the M9 and R44 in the western suburb of Heldervue and Vergelegen Plein is located in the eastern suburb of Dennegeur. Sitari Country Estate just outside Somerset West also has a new shopping centre, Sitari Village Mall.

Tourism
Somerset West offers several tourist attractions due to its position on the Hottentots-Holland mountains and between the Cape Winelands and the nearby beaches of Strand and Gordon's Bay.

Wine
Somerset West forms part of the Helderberg Wine Region which is a wine-producing sub-region of the greater Stellenbosch Wine Region. Helderberg includes wine estates such as include 96 Winery, Alto, Audacia, Annandale, Cavalli, Ernie Els, Grangehurst, Guardian Peak, Haskell, Hidden Valley, Idiom, Ken Forrester, Klein Welmoed, Le Riche, Longridge, Lourensford, Lyngrove, Miravel, Morgenster, Peter Falke, Post House, Somerbosch, Uva Mira, Vergelegen, Vergenoegd and Waterkloof.

The most popular and nearest wine estates amongst the many surrounding Somerset West are Vergelegen and Lourensford. The Vergelegen Wine Estate lies on the border of Somerset West, spanning into the Hottentots Holland Nature Reserve. The buildings on the estate constitute fine examples of Cape Dutch architecture.

The Lourensford Wine Estate which neighbours the Vergelegen Wine Estate features the Lourensford Market and a Sports car museum known as MOTOR Studio.

Festivals
Every December, the town has a display of Christmas lights erected atop the street lights of the Main Road. The Helderberg Lights Festival (aka the Strawberry Festival), a flea market and parade, normally complements these lights.

Nature
The Helderberg Nature Reserve, a 363 hectare natural wildlife preserve opened in 1964, contains a wide variety of smaller fauna (small antelope, tortoises and other reptiles) and indigenous flora such as Protea and fynbos.

Guest Houses & B&Bs
In recent years many guest houses and B&Bs have opened up in Somerset West, since it is conveniently located for Cape Town ( away on the N2 motorway), the beaches at the Strand and Gordon's Bay, and the Western Cape's numerous wine farms.

Education
The town has a range of primary and secondary educational facilities.

Primary schools

Somerset West Primary School
Somerset House
Somerset College
Somerset West Private School
Helderberg Primary School
De Hoop Primary
Beaumont Primary
International School of Helderberg
Danie Ackerman Primary School
Reddam House Somerset
Newberry Montessori School
Curro Primary School

High schools

Hottentots Holland High School
Parel Vallei High School
Somerset College
Somerset West Private School 
Helderberg High School
International School of Helderberg
Gordon High School
Reddam House Somerset
The Mayor Matthews Institution for Excellence
Christian Kotzé

Higher Education
Helderberg College of Higher Education

Transport

Busses
Somerset West is serviced by the commuter bus service of Golden Arrow which services the Cape Metropole. Golden Arrow links Somerset West with Cape Town, Delft, Bellville, Khayelitsha, Lwandle, Macassar, Nyanga, Strand and Mitchell's Plain.

Rail
Somerset West lies on the Strand rail branch of the  Northern Line operated by Metrorail Western Cape commuter rail system which connects Somerset West to Cape Town in the north-west via Firgrove, Eersterivier, Kuilsrivier and Bellville and to Strand in the south-east via Van der Stel. 

Somerset West's considerably far distance from Cape Town within the metropole means that the railway remains an important link to the city and therefore transports huge numbers of commuters every day.

Roads
Somerset West has access to one national route, the N2 and two regional routes, the R44 and R102. 

The N2 highway links Somerset West to Cape Town International Airport and Cape Town in the north-west and Grabouw and George in the east. The N2 highway to Cape Town begins as a freeway after the intersection with the R102 on the outskirts of Somerset West. After the R102 intersection, the N2 passes under the R44 off-ramp (Exit 43) near Somerset Mall.

The R44 links Somerset West to Stellenbosch in the north as Broadway Boulevard/Strand Road and Strand, Gordon's Bay and Kleinmond in the south-east as Main Road. The R102 links Somerset West to Kuilsrivier in the north-west via Firgrove, Croydon and Eersterivier as Strand Road. From Kuilsrivier, the R102 further links to Bellville and Cape Town. 

Somerset West has access to several metropolitan routes in the Greater Cape Town metropolitan area. The M9 Main Road links Somerset West to Wynberg in Cape Town via Macassar, Khayelitsha, Philippi and Nyanga in the north-west and Sir Lowry's Pass Village in the south-east. The M149 Victoria Street links Somerset West to Strand (via R44). The M153 links Somerset West to Strand in the south-east. The M156 links Somerset West with Firgrove in the north-west.

Taxis
Somerset West is served two kinds of taxis: metered taxis and minibus taxis. Unlike many cities and towns in South Africa, metered taxis are not allowed to drive around the town to solicit fares and instead must be called to a specific location. Metered taxi companies operating in Somerset West include Uber, Bolt, InDriver and Didi. 

Minibus taxis are a major form of public transportation in Somerset West and the majority of minibus taxis terminate at the Somerset West Taxi Interchange/Terminus in the CBD.

Notable people 

Selborne Boome – rugby union player
Ramsay Carelse – high jumper
Eddie Daniels – ex-political prisoner on Robben Island
Justin Harding - golfer
Trevor Immelman – professional golfer and winner of the 2008 Masters Tournament.
Chris McGregor – jazz pianist, bandleader and composer
H. V. Morton – journalist and travel writer
Ernest "Eddie" Peirce – boxer
Handré Pollard - rugby union player
Storm Roux - New Zealand international footballer

Coats of arms
Municipality (1) — Somerset West was a municipality in its own right from 1904 to 1996.  The council approved its first coat of arms on 23 April 1935.

Municipality (2) — In 1953, the council approved a new design, by Ivan Mitford-Barberton and H. Ellis Tomlinson.  This was in response to a Cape Provincial Administration circular calling on municipalities to have their arms checked and, if necessary, re-designed to make them heraldically correct.  The arms were granted by the College of Arms on 25 November 1953.  They were registered at the Bureau of Heraldry in June 1994.

The arms were: Azure,  a  portcullis chained Or; on a chief of the last a setting sun Gules (i.e. a blue shield displaying a red setting sun on a golden stripe across the top, and a golden portcullis with chains below it).  The crest was a golden demi-lion holding a vine, issuing from a red mural crown charged with three golden rings.  The motto was Prorsum sursum.  The design is canting: the portcullis comes from the Somerset family arms, and the setting sun denotes the west.

Gallery

References

 
Suburbs of Cape Town
Populated places established in 1822
1822 establishments in the Cape Colony

zh:開普敦